Hamilton Ironworks is John Hartford's last album, recorded before his death in 2001. Along with the Hartford Stringband, Hartford interprets 22 traditional fiddle tunes. The title track is a traditional Ozarks tune referring to an old mine in Meramec State Park, Missouri.

Reception

Writing for Allmusic, critic Jesse Jarnow wrote "There are few concessions given to modernity, and, while bringing his own distinct voice to the tunes, Hartford is clearly aware of the historical stream he occupies, coming off as both a devoted scholar and respectful practitioner." John Lupton of Country Standard Time wrote the album "highlights the fact that he was primarily a fiddler, and a damn good one... while the acceptance of fiddle and banjo music has long been at the mercy of producers with little or no concept of the music's dynamics, Carlin demonstrates exceptionally that in the hands of someone who understands what the music's about, it equals anything Nashville or L.A. has to offer."

Track listing
All tracks are Traditional.
"Intro" –  :59
"Knockin' at Your Door" – 3:40
"Woodchopper's Breakdown" – 3:18
"Hamilton Ironworks" – 4:01
"Jawbone" – 2:11
"Politic" * – 3:29
"Wooliver's Money Musk" – 3:27
"Ragtime Dream" – 4:20
"Quail Is a Pretty Bird	" – 3:25
"Eminence Breakdown" – 3:09
"Ragged Bill	" – 2:57
"Hi Dad in the Morning" – 3:57
"Black River" – 3:12
"Green Corn" – 2:42
"Devil's Hornpipe" – 3:56
"Wolves a Howlin'" – 2:23
"Fiddler's Hornpipe" – 2:57
"White River" – 2:56
"Greenback Dollar" – 2:37
"Comin' Down from Denver on a Trip to Galway Here and There" – 4:50
"Chicken Oh Chicken" – 2:23
"Goforth's Dusty Miller" – 3:04
"Turkey Buzzard" – 3:28

 The euphemistic title "Politic" is Hartford's playful bow to what he refers to as "political correctness" concerning a certain word from an earlier and more overtly racist era of American history—the tune has traditionally been commonly known as "N****r In The Woodpile," a phrase which originated in the mid-19th century in the context of Southern runaway slaves hiding in freight-wagons loaded with wood in their attempts to flee to the North. The word "politic" is an adjective which means "(of an action) seeming sensible and judicious under the circumstances."   In this track, Hartford is heard to half-sing, "'Politic'--now, it's a name so politically incorrect that we can't even explain it in the liner notes... 'Politic'-- perhaps the only way is to come up to me at a show or a festival, and I'll whisper it in your ear..."

It’s worth noting that what some commonly refer to and often disparage as “political correctness” is seen by others as deeply offensive, as in the case of this song’s original title.

Personnel
John Hartford - fiddle, vocals
Bob Carlin - banjo
Mike Compton - mandolin
Larry Perkins - banjo, bass, fiddle
Chris Sharp - guitar

Production
Producer: Bob Carlin
Recording Engineer and mixing: Wes Lachot
Mastering: David Glasser
Design: Joanna Bodenweber
Liner notes: John Hartford

References

External links
LP Discography of John Hartford.

2001 albums
John Hartford albums
Rounder Records albums